Opisthotriton is an extinct genus of prehistoric salamanders that lived in North America between at least the Upper Cretaceous and the Paleocene.

See also 
 List of prehistoric amphibians

References 

Prehistoric amphibian genera
Cenozoic salamanders
Late Cretaceous amphibians
Cretaceous amphibians of North America
Cretaceous United States
Hell Creek fauna
Laramie Formation
Cretaceous–Paleogene boundary
Fossils of Canada
Paleontology in Alberta
Paleontology in Saskatchewan
Fossil taxa described in 1961